There is a significant community of Indians in Israel doing white-collar jobs mainly working in the industrial sector; some have started their own businesses. They are mostly members of mixed families, more specifically, Halachically non-Jewish members of Jewish households living in Israel. The Indian migrants work in sectors of the Israel economy such as construction, manufacturing and the service sector. The Indian migrant  mainly come from places like Ernakulam, Mala, Parur, Chennamangalam and Cochin as well. Around 85,000 Indians in Israel are Indian Jews.

See also
 Hinduism in Israel
 Sri Lankans in Israel
 Indian Jews in Israel

References

Asian diaspora in Israel
Ethnic groups in Israel
Israel